Ruth White (born July 16, 1951) is an American doctor and retired fencer.

Life and career
White was born on July 16, 1951 in Baltimore, Maryland where she faced racial discrimination at school for being African-American.

In 1969, White became the first African-American to win a US fencing championship. She also competed at the 1971 Pan American Games where she won a gold medal in the team foil event and silver medal in the individual foil event.

She was the first African-American women to represent the US in fencing at the Olympics. She competed in the women's individual and team foil events at the 1972 Summer Olympics.

Soon after she competed at the Olympics, White left fencing to go into medicine at the New York University School of Medicine and went on to work in internal medicine.

White was inducted into NYU's Hall of Fame in 1989 and into the USA Fencing Hall of Fame in 2001.

References

External links
 

1951 births
Living people
American female foil fencers
American internists
20th-century American physicians
Olympic fencers of the United States
Fencers at the 1972 Summer Olympics
Sportspeople from Baltimore
Physicians from Baltimore
Pan American Games medalists in fencing
Pan American Games gold medalists for the United States
Pan American Games silver medalists for the United States
Fencers at the 1971 Pan American Games
New York University Grossman School of Medicine alumni
Medalists at the 1971 Pan American Games
20th-century African-American women
20th-century African-American physicians
21st-century African-American women
21st-century African-American people
Women internists